The Hamburg Chamber of Commerce (Handelskammer Hamburg), originally named the Commercial Deputation (Commerz-Deputation), is the chamber of commerce for the city state of Hamburg, and was founded in 1665. Hamburg has for centuries been a commercial centre of Northern Europe, and the Hamburg Chamber of Commerce currently has 160,000 companies as its members. It was traditionally one of the three main political bodies of Hamburg.

Role

The chamber has several official responsibilities. The Hamburg Stock Exchange (founded in 1558) is owned by and subordinate to the Hamburg Chamber of Commerce. The chamber has its offices in the old stock exchange building.

The Commercial Deputation, founded in 1665, originally consisted of seven members, elected among the city's "honourable merchants." Each member became President of the Commercial Deputation during his last year in office. The Commercial Deputation was officially recognised by the Hamburg council (senate) in 1674 as the representation of the city's merchants. From 1710, all the seven members of the Commercial Deputation were also ex officio members of the Erbgesessene Bürgerschaft (the Hamburg Parliament). The Commercial Deputation was, along with council/senate and Bürgerschaft, one of the most important political bodies of Hamburg.

In 1735, the Commerzbibliothek (Library of Commerce) was founded, and is the oldest library of its kind. In 1867, the Commercial Deputation was transformed into the Hamburg Chamber of Commerce.

Since 2004 the Chamber of Commerce organizes the bi-annual Hamburg Summit: China meets Europe.

Presidents of the Hamburg Commercial Deputation and Chamber of Commerce since 1665

External links

 Hamburg Chamber of Commerce official Web site

References  

Chamber of Commerce
Chamber of Commerce
Chambers of commerce
1665 establishments in the Holy Roman Empire
17th-century establishments in the Holy Roman Empire